Talking Timbuktu is the 1994 collaboration album between Malian guitarist Ali Farka Touré and American guitarist/producer Ry Cooder.  The guitar riff from the song "Diaraby" was selected for the Geo-quiz segment of The World PRI-BBC radio program and was retained by popular demand when put to a vote by the listeners. In 2009, the album was awarded a gold certification from the Independent Music Companies Association which indicated sales of at least 100,000 copies throughout Europe.

Reception
The album features in the book 1001 Albums You Must Hear Before You Die and received the Grammy Award for Best World Music album of 1994.

Track listing
 "Bonde" – 5:28
 "Soukora" – 6:05
 "Gomni" – 7:00
 "Sega" – 3:10
 "Amandrai" – 9:22
 "Lasidan" – 6:06
 "Keito" – 5:42
 "Banga" – 2:32
 "Ai Du" – 7:09
 "Diaraby" – 7:25

Certifications

References

1994 albums
Collaborative albums
Ali Farka Touré albums
Ry Cooder albums
World Circuit (record label) albums
Grammy Award for Best World Music Album